The 28th Battalion was the most potent strike group of the ULFA, the banned separatist group of Assam. The 28 Battalion was headed by late hardcore militant leader Tapan Baruah. It is also called the Kashmir Camp. It has its headquarters in Myanmar (Burma).

At the time of decisive, it consisted of three companies – Alpha (A), led by Jiten Dutta alias Moon Bora, Bravo (B) led by Sujit Mahan and Charlie (C), led by Jone Bhuyan(disputed).

The battalion was the group's main source of funding.

Commanders 

 Tapan Baruah alias Madan Das (Killed)
 Prabal Neog alias Benudhar Bora (Surrendered)
 Mrinal Hazarika alias Plaban Phukan (Surrendered)
 Prabal Neog alias Benudhar Bora (Surrendered)
 Bijoy Das alias Bijoy Chinese (Surrendered)

Ceasefire
On Tuesday, June 24, 2008, 'A' and 'C' companies of the battalion announced a unilateral ceasefire to facilitate peace talks with the government.

More than 200 cadres led by at least five of their commanders came over-ground and christened themselves the "Pro-talk ULFA faction". They gave up the demand for independence for Assam and instead sought maximum autonomy for the state. 'A' company had been active in the eastern Tinsukia and Dibrugarh districts as well as in adjoining Arunachal Pradesh. 'C' company was active in Sibsagar and Golaghat districts. 'B' company seemed to be outside the purview of the truce as its commander, Sujit Moran, distanced himself from the pro-ceasefire group. Meanwhile, Mrinal Hazarika, made it clear that they would not surrender before the government and would be residing with arms in designated camps set-up at Chapakhowa, Tinsukia.

Split in ULFA?
Although it looks like a split in the group, senior ULFA commander (pro-talk) Jiten Dutta, said that the ULFA was not split and they would disclose everything as to why they had decided to declare the unilateral ceasefire. "Since most of the top leaders and cadres of 'B' company are at bases abroad, they are not in a position to declare the truce," Dutta said.

Appealing mass-support
After their announcement of a ceasefire, the leaders began interacting with various organisations and individuals to mobilise support to their declaration of a unilateral ceasefire and the peace process they had initiated. On Sunday, July 7, 2008, Mrinal Hazarika, led a delegation of 'A' and 'C' companies to interact with leaders of the Asom Jatiyatabadi Yuba Chatra Parishad (AJYCP) and the All Assam Students’ Union (AASU). An executive of AASU was said to have discussed the appeal of the pro-talk faction for support to their efforts to mobilise public opinion to put pressure on the unit’s central leadership. On Tuesday, July 8, 2008 Nirjatan Birodhi Aikya Mancha organized a meeting at Sadiya to back the unilateral truce declaration by the battalion.

Expulsion of leaders

The ULFA C-in-C Paresh Baruah, is understood to have disbanded 'A' and 'C' companies of the battalion and reportedly issued threats to those compromising commanders, Mrinal Hazarika (Commander of the battalion), Moon Bora, alias Jiten Dutta, ('A' company commander) and Joon Sonowal ('C' company commander). The group had expelled those leaders on Monday July 7, 2008, for "unauthorised declaration of unilateral truce and initiating the dialogue process with the Government of India in violation of the ULFA constitution." Arabinda Rajkhowa, the group’s chairman, appealed to all cadres of the unit and the people of Assam not to extend any cooperation to the expelled persons’ activities.

Merging of 'B' and 'C' companies
'B' company was merged with the remaining cadres of 'C' company who had not joined the pro-ceasefire group and Bijoy Chinese had been appointed as the new commander of the battalion.

Submission of Demands
The pro-talk ULFA leaders Mrinal Hazarika, Prabal Neog and Jiten Dutta, in a press conference in Guwahati, revealed that they had submitted a charter containing 18 demands to the Prime Minister, Manmohan Singh, through Assam's chief minister Tarun Gogoi.

The demands include:

 Full autonomy within the framework of the Indian constitution.
 a) To keep 70% of seats reserved for the indigenous people in the Assam Legislative Assembly and b) To create an Upper House comprising indigenous and ethnic people.
 To seal the Indo-Bangla border to check illegal infiltration.
 To detect and deport foreign nationals taking 25.03.1971 to be the cut off year as per the memorandum of understanding between the AASU and the Government of India.
 To detect foreign nationals by preparing a revised national register of citizens of 1951.
 The detection of foreign nationals to be kept in a special/specific area and to deport them phase-wise.
 To introduce dual citizenship.
 To introduce the system of an inter-state permit.
 To form a border commission to find solutions of the border disputes of the north-eastern states.
 To adopt a scientific approach to the flood related problems and to recognize the floods in Assam as a national calamity.
 Immediate steps to be taken to stop hydro-electric projects which will cause immense damage to the state of Assam.
 To open and develop the Ledo Road to connect Assam with south-east Asia immediately.
 To have dialogue with all the insurgent groups of the north-east to restore permanent peace in the region.
 To declare the river Brahmaputra to be a national waterway.
 To take the steps necessary to declare Majuli a world heritage site, (by the government of India).
 A special task force to be constituted by recruiting the indigenous people of the north-east and to deploy them on the indo-Bangla border to check infiltration and safeguard the frontier.
 To construct a seventh bridge across the Brahmaputra to connect Nimatighat and Majuli.
 The immediate release of the four central committee leaders of ULFA from jail.

Threat to go underground

Being disheartened at the delay in the talk-process, this pro-talk faction on Monday, June 22, 2009, threatened to go back to the jungle, blaming a lack of any government initiative to begin peace talks. The pro-talk ULFA faction leader Jiten Dutta told the Indian News Agency (IANS) that after their announcement of a ceasefire entire Assam was at peace and not a single incident of violence had taken place in the past year. He blamed the government and various pressure groups, individuals, organisations and intellectuals of Assam for paying no heed to their peace overtures.

First round of talks
On Thursday, October 29, 2009, the Central government initiated the first round of formal talks with the pro-talk faction of the ULFA. Three leaders of the pro-talk faction -- Mrinal Hazarika, Prabal Neog ang Jiten Dutta participated in an hour-long meeting with the Assistant Director of the Indian Intelligence Bureau, R. N. Ravi, held in a secret location somewhere in Guwahati. They once again reiterated their demands and urged the official to take steps for furthering the peace process. They claimed the meeting had ended on a very positive note.

See also
 Sanjukta Mukti Fouj
 List of top ULFA leaders
 Mina Gogoi

References

Politics of Assam
Paramilitary organisations based in India
Terrorism in Assam
Paramilitary organisations based in Myanmar